Aviva is a  length motor yacht. She is the fourth yacht named Aviva built for Bahamas-based British businessman Joe Lewis, and replaces the 68m Aviva (III). Like her predecessor, Aviva was designed by Reymond Langton, and built by Lemwerder-based German builder Abeking & Rasmussen. She was launched in 2017, has the IMO Number 1012957, and the MMSI Number 319111300.

Aviva acts as Lewis's floating home and office, and features an indoor, full-sized padel tennis court.

See also
List of motor yachts by length

References

Motor yachts
Ships built in Germany
2017 ships